"Kinfolks" is a song recorded by American country music singer Sam Hunt, released as a single on October 11, 2019. It is the third single from Hunt's second studio album Southside. It is Hunt's ninth single release, and he co-wrote it with Zach Crowell, Jerry Flowers, and Josh Osborne. It debuted at number 64 on the US Billboard Hot 100 and ultimately peaked at number 34.

Critical reception
The track was described by Sterling Whitaker of Taste of Country as a "traditional-themed love song about wanting a lover to meet the family and see the places and faces most important to you" as well as a "progressive musical track features the kind of spoken-work, not-quite-rapping verses Hunt is best known for". Writing for Rolling Stone, Jon Freeman described the song as featuring "acoustic guitar arpeggios that lead into big, bright choruses of banjo, vocal snippets, and wah-wah guitar", also calling it "not too far afield from the all-embracing sound that made his debut Montevallo such a compelling listen".

Commercial performance
"Kinfolks" debuted at number 18 on the Billboard Country Airplay chart based on three and a half day of availability after its release to radio, which equals the debut of his previous single, "Downtown's Dead". It was the second best-selling country song the following week, with 13,000 copies sold, in addition to the 2,000 copies sold when it was released for sale late the previous week.  It reached No. 1 on Billboards Country Airplay on chart dated February 29, 2020. It is also the first country song to top the Country Airplay chart on Leap Day since Garth Brooks' "What She's Doing Now" stayed for the third week in 1992, as well as Hunt's first number one since "Body Like a Back Road" in 2017. It has sold 72,000 copies in the United States as of March 2020.

Charts

Weekly charts

Year-end charts

Certifications

References

2019 singles
2019 songs
Sam Hunt songs
Songs written by Jerry Flowers
Songs written by Josh Osborne
Songs written by Sam Hunt
Songs written by Zach Crowell
MCA Nashville Records singles